Membrane estrogen receptors (mERs) are a group of receptors which bind estrogen. Unlike the estrogen receptor (ER), a nuclear receptor which mediates its effects via genomic mechanisms, mERs are cell surface receptors which rapidly alter cell signaling via modulation of intracellular signaling cascades. Putative mERs include membrane-associated ERα (mERα) and ERβ (mERβ), GPER (GPR30), GPRC6A, ER-X, ERx and Gq-mER.

The mERs have been reviewed.

See also
 Membrane steroid receptor

References

G protein-coupled receptors
Human proteins
Human female endocrine system